Princess Yong'an (永安公主, 20 July 1377 – 26 January 1417), born Zhu Yuying (朱玉英), was a princess of the Ming dynasty. She was the oldest daughter of the Yongle Emperor and the elder sister of the Hongxi Emperor.

Life 
Zhu Yuying was born on 20 July 1377, to Zhu Di, who held at that time the title of Prince of Yan (燕王), and his consort, Lady Xu.

When her father ascended the throne, she was honoured as Princess Yong'an (永安公主) and her husband was awarded the title of Prince Consort (駙馬). Later, her husband was granted the title of Marquis of Guangping.

Zhu Yuying had six siblings by the same mother: Zhu Gaochi, Zhu Gaoxu, Zhu Gaosui, Princess Yongping, Princess Ancheng and Princess Xianning. Furthermore, she had to two half siblings by her father concubines: Princess Changning and Zhu Gaoxi.

The princess was married to Yuan Rong, with whom she had four children: one son and three daughters. Her son, Yuan Zhen, inherited his father title and beame the second Marquis Guangping.

Princess Yong'an died on 26 January 1417 of unknown causes. She was buried in Fangshan, Beijing.

Family 

 Husband: Yuan Rong, Marquis of Guangping (廣平侯 袁容, d. January 1428), son of Yuan Hong (袁洪)
 Son: Yuan Zhen (袁禎), 2nd Marquis of Guangping
 Daughters:
 Yuan Ningning (袁寧寧), first daughter
 Married Zheng Neng (鄭能), son of Zheng Heng, Marquis of Wu'an (武安侯 鄭亨)
 Yuan Yaoying (袁堯英), second daughter
 Yuan Shou'en (袁受恩), third daughter

Ancestry

References 

1377 births
1416 deaths
Daughters of emperors
Ming dynasty princesses